Ko Sichang (or Koh Sichang) is a district (amphoe) of Chonburi province, Thailand. It consists of the island of Ko Sichang and its adjoining islands. Ko Sichang is in the Gulf of Thailand, 12 km off the shore of Si Racha district.

History

Three kings of the Chakri Dynasty, King Rama IV, Rama V, and Rama VI, occasionally visited the island for rest. King Rama V built a summer palace, Phra Chuthathut Palace, named after his son who was born on this island, Prince Chuthathut. The royal residence was largely abandoned in 1893 after the French occupied the island during a conflict with Thailand over control of neighboring Laos. In 1900, parts of the palace was torn down and reassembled as  part of Vimanmek Mansion in Bangkok.

The British diplomat John Crawfurd, visiting the islands in 1822 during his mission, described the island in his book Journal of an embassy from the Governor-General of India to the courts of Siam and Cochin-China: exhibiting a view of the actual state of those kingdoms. He reported that Francis Buchanan-Hamilton called the islands of Ko Sichang District the "Dutch Islands", and Ko Sichang itself "Amsterdam", due to frequent visits by ships of the Dutch East India Company during the 17th century. American diplomat Edmund Roberts visited the island in the 1830s, describing the area as being occupied by "a few fisherman" who also grew yams, bananas, capsicums, gourds, and cucumbers.

The island was originally a minor district (king amphoe) under the Mueang Samut Prakan district of Samut Prakan province. On 1 January 1943, it was reassigned to the Si Racha district of Chonburi province. On 4 July 1994 the minor district was upgraded to a full district.

Climate
Ko Sichang has a tropical savanna climate (Köppen climate classification Aw). The monsoon season runs from May through October, with heavy rainfall.

Administration
The district consists of a single sub-district (tambon) Tha Thewawong (ท่าเทววงษ์), which is further subdivided into seven villages (mubans). The district is completely covered by the township (thesaban tambon) Ko Sichang.

Nearby islands

 Ko Sampan Yue
 Ko Kham Noi
 Ko Kham Yai
 Ko Prong
 Ko Ran Dok Mai
 Ko Yai Thao
 Ko Khangkhao
 Ko Thai Ta Muen

See also
List of islands of Thailand

References

External links

Website of the district (Thai only)
Amphoe Ko Sichang from amphoe.com (Thai only)

Islands of Thailand
Ko Sichang
Islands of the Gulf of Thailand